The 1995–96 season was the 57th season in UE Lleida's existence, and their 2nd year in Segunda División after relegation, and covered the period from July 1, 1995 to June 30, 1996.

First-team squad

Transfers

In

Competitions

Pre-season

Segunda División

Copa del Rey

Results summary

1996
Lleida
Lleida
Lleida